State Route 300 (abbreviated SR 300) is a four-lane controlled-access expressway inside of Memphis, Tennessee that goes from Interstate 40 to U.S. Highway 51. SR 300 is unsigned throughout its length except on mileposts. The exit signs on I-40 just refer to SR 300 as Exit 2A going to US 51 and Millington. SR 300 carries a  speed limit. Local media sometimes refers to this short route as the "101 Connector", its former federal aid urban designation (U-101 connector). The I-69 designation has been approved for the entire length of SR 300.

History
SR 300 was originally part of an abortive effort in the 1960s to build an expressway connecting the northern portion of the then Interstate 240 to Mud Island.  Ghost ramps and abandoned grading for this expressway still exist at the current western terminus of SR 300 at U.S. Highway 51 and also at Interstate 40 Exit 1 in downtown Memphis.

Future
SR 300 is slated to be signed as part of the proposed Interstate 69.  In November 2004, the Tennessee Department of Transportation announced alternative A-1 (SIU 9) as the preferred alignment of future Interstate 69 through the Memphis area which will include SR 300.

Exit list

See also

References

External links
Tennessee Department of Transportation
TDOT smartway Information System
TDOT smartway traffic camera at TN 300 and I-40
TDOT smartway traffic camera at TN 300 and US 51
Shelby County Highway Map
Northwest Memphis City Highway Map
TDOT Interstate 69 Preferred Alignment Announcement

Interstate 69
300
Transportation in Memphis, Tennessee
Freeways in Tennessee
Transportation in Shelby County, Tennessee